Gems is a compilation album released by Aerosmith in 1988 under the label Columbia. It was the first compilation of studio material since 1980's Greatest Hits. Concentrating mainly on heavier material than the radio-friendly singles output on Greatest Hits, the album is noted for the inclusion of the 1978 studio version of "Chip Away The Stone" – previously released as a single from 1978's Live! Bootleg, only a live rendition of the song was released at the time. Originally scheduled for release on November 8, 1988, the album was delayed one week and issued on November 15, 1988.

In 2007 The album was released by Sony BMG as part of their 'Collections' series entitled 'Greatest Hits' and reissued the following year by Sony in their 'Steel Box' series.

Track listing

Personnel
Aerosmith
Steven Tyler – lead vocals, harmonica, piano, producer
Tom Hamilton – bass
Joey Kramer – drums, percussion
Joe Perry – lead and rhythm guitar, backing vocals
Brad Whitford – rhythm and lead guitar
Additional musicians
Jimmy Crespo – lead guitar on "Jailbait"
Rick Dufay – rhythm guitar on "Jailbait"
David Woodford – Saxophone
Richard Supa – Piano
Scott Cushnie – Piano
Mark Radice - Piano on "Chip Away The Stone"
Uncredited guitarist on some songs.
Production
David Krebs – Executive Producer
Steve Leber – Executive Producer
Gary Lyons – Producer
Adrian Barber – Producer
Tony Bongiovi – Producer
Jack Douglas – Producer
Ray Colcord – Producer
Don DeVito – Digital Producer
John Ingrassia – Project Administrator
James Diener – Project Director
Mark Wilder – Assembly, Engineer, Digital Mastering
Keith Garde – Creative Supervision
Caroline Greyshock – Photography
Jimmy Ienner Jr. – Photography
Darren S. Winston – Creative Consultant
Joel Zimmerman – Art Supervisor
Lisa Sparagano – Design
Ken Fredette – Design
Vic Anesini – Digital Mastering

Chart positions

Certification

Release history

References

External links

1988 compilation albums
Aerosmith compilation albums
Albums produced by Jack Douglas (record producer)
Albums produced by Tony Bongiovi
Columbia Records compilation albums